The vast majority of the National Security Agency's work on encryption is classified, but from time to time NSA participates in standards processes or otherwise publishes information about its cryptographic algorithms.  The NSA has categorized encryption items into four product types, and algorithms into two suites. The following is a brief and incomplete summary of public knowledge about NSA algorithms and protocols.

Type 1 Product

A Type 1 Product refers to an NSA endorsed classified or controlled cryptographic item for classified or sensitive U.S. government information, including cryptographic equipment, assembly or component classified or certified by NSA for encrypting and decrypting classified and sensitive national security information when appropriately keyed.

Type 2 Product

A Type 2 Product refers to an NSA endorsed unclassified cryptographic equipment, assemblies or components for sensitive but unclassified U.S. government information.

Type 3 Product

Unclassified cryptographic equipment, assembly, or component used, when appropriately keyed, for encrypting or decrypting unclassified sensitive U.S. Government or commercial information, and to protect systems requiring protection mechanisms consistent with standard commercial practices. A Type 3 Algorithm refers to NIST endorsed algorithms, registered and FIPS published, for sensitive but unclassified U.S. government and commercial information.

Type 4 Product

A Type 4 Algorithm refers to algorithms that are registered by the NIST but are not FIPS published. Unevaluated commercial cryptographic equipment, assemblies, or components that are neither NSA nor NIST certified for any Government usage.

Algorithm Suites

Suite A 

A set of NSA unpublished algorithms that is intended for highly sensitive communication and critical authentication systems.

Suite B

A set of NSA endorsed cryptographic algorithms for use as an interoperable cryptographic base for both unclassified information and most classified information. Suite B was announced on 16 February 2005, and phased out in 2016.

Commercial National Security Algorithm Suite 

A set of cryptographic algorithms promulgated by the National Security Agency as a replacement for NSA Suite B Cryptography until post-quantum cryptography standards are promulgated.

Quantum resistant suite

In August 2015, NSA announced that it is planning to transition "in the not distant future" to a new cipher suite that is resistant to quantum attacks. "Unfortunately, the growth of elliptic curve use has bumped up against the fact of continued progress in the research on quantum computing, necessitating a re-evaluation of our cryptographic strategy." NSA advised: "For those partners and vendors that have not yet made the transition to Suite B algorithms, we recommend not making a significant expenditure to do so at this point but instead to prepare for the upcoming quantum resistant algorithm transition."

See also
 NSA encryption systems
 Speck and Simon, light-weight block ciphers, published by NSA in 2013

References 

National Security Agency
Type 1 encryption algorithms
Type 2 encryption algorithms
Type 3 encryption algorithms
National Security Agency encryption devices